Jakhala is a village in Nahar Tehsil in Nahar Block of Rewari, in Rewari district of Haryana, India, and belongs to the Gurgaon Division. Its Pin code is 123301.

Nearby villages
 Murlipur
 Kanharwas
 Gopalpur Gazi
 Surkhpur Tappra Kosli
 Gudiani

References

Villages in Rewari district